Stealth Records is an independent record label that specializes in electronic dance music, specifically house. DJ/producer Roger Sanchez founded Stealth in 2002.

In 2005, Stealth expanded into running its own events with a series called Stealth Live!. The events have grown into a recurring series of club parties in major electronic music markets such as the Netherlands, Germany, England, Spain and the U.S.

Releases
Stealth has released music by the following artists:

Add2Basket
Agent Greg
Alex Gomez
Applescal
Audiopunch
Austin Leeds
Avicii
Axwell
Baggi Begovic
Belocca
Benny Royal
Blacktron
Buset
Carl Kennedy
Carlos Silva
Charles H. Brown
Chris Moody
Chus & Ceballos
D. Ramirez
D.O.N.S.
Da Hool
Daley Padley
Danila
Dario Nunez
David Vendetta
David Vio
David West
Dean Coleman
DJ Colorblind
DJ Dove
DJ Kieth
DJ Madskillz
DJ Nick Corline
Eddie Amador
Eddie Thoneick
Elio Riso
Eric Kupper
Filthy Rich
Funkerman
Gabi Newman
Gabriel & Castellon
Gregor Salto
Greg Stainer
Hardwell
Interplay
James Fitch
Jason Chance
Jeremy Sylvester
Jerry Ropero
Jesse Garcia
Joeski
Juice String
Kid Massive
Laidback Luke
Le Knight Club
Lex Da Funk
Ludaphunk
Marcoradi
Mark Knight
Martijn Ten Velden
Martin Accorsi
Medina
Mephisto
Michael Simon
Michelle Weeks
Midnite Sleaze
Miguel Picasso
Mitiska
MLA
Marcelo Oleas
Muzikjunki
Muzzaik
Myu Myu
Nari & Milani
Nick Terranova
Nicola Fasano
Noir
Pan-Pot
Per QX
Peter Gelderblom
Phunk Investigation
Pier Bucci
Pillbox
Pornocult
Prok & Fitch
Raffunk
Rene Amesz
Roger Sanchez / S-Man
Sebastian Ingrosso
SMOKINGROOVE
Soneec
Stefano Noferini
Steve Angello
Sueno Soul
The Cube Guys
The Nightcrawlers
The Transatlatins
Tiko’s Groove
Tim Berg
Tom de Neef
Tom Stephan
Tuccillo
TV Rock
Vibe Residents

See also
List of record labels

References

External links
 

American independent record labels
Record labels established in 2002
Electronic dance music record labels